Ceršak ( or ) is a settlement above the right bank of the Mura River in the Municipality of Šentilj in northeastern Slovenia, right next to the border with Austria.

There is a small chapel in the centre of the settlement. It was built in the 19th century.

References

External links 
Ceršak on Geopedia

Populated places in the Municipality of Šentilj